La Hoguette is a commune in the Calvados department in the Normandy region in northwestern France.

Archeology

La Hoguette is also the type site of the early Neolithic La Hoguette culture that is found mainly in association with Linear pottery (Linearbandkeramic) or Limburg pottery in Northern France, The Netherlands, Alsace and Western Germany. It is believed to ultimately derive from the Mediterranean Cardial culture traditions. Important sites of the La-Hoguette culture include Stuttgart-Wilhelma, Dautenheim and Godelau.

The La Hoguette pottery was found under a later megalithic tomb and first misidentified as Linearbandkeramic. La Hoguette marks the westernmost point of the distribution of this culture.
The place name La Hoguette is believed to derive from the Old Norse word Haugr meaning a knoll or a hill.

Population

Personalities
La Hoguette was the birthplace of Georges Marchais (1920–1997), head of the French Communist Party.

See also
Communes of the Calvados department

References

External links

  La Hoguette (M.O. Baldwin)

Communes of Calvados (department)
Calvados communes articles needing translation from French Wikipedia